is a train station in Kakegawa, Shizuoka Prefecture, Japan. It is located 1.8 rail kilometers from the terminus of the line at Kakegawa Station.

Station History
Nishi-Kakegaa Station was established on May 10, 1956 as a passenger station on the Japan National Railway Futamata Line. After the privatization of JNR on March 15, 1987, the station came under the control of the Tenryū Hamanako Line.

Lines
Tenryū Hamanako Railroad
Tenryū Hamanako Line

Layout
Nishi-Kakegawa Station is an unmanned station with a single, elevated side platform.

Adjacent stations

|-
!colspan=5|Tenryū Hamanako Railroad

External links
  Tenryū Hamanako Railroad Station information

Railway stations in Japan opened in 1954
Railway stations in Shizuoka Prefecture
Stations of Tenryū Hamanako Railroad